The Large Plane Trees, also called Road Menders at Saint-Rémy is an oil painting by Vincent van Gogh. Painted in 1889 in Saint-Rémy, France, the painting depicts roadwork underneath autumn trees with yellow leaves. In actuality, "The Large Pane Trees" and the "Road Menders of Saint-Rémy" are two different paintings and are sometimes confused as one. Van Gogh painted "The Large Plane Trees" first on a red and white checkered table cloth. He later returned and painted it again on an art canvas.

It is in the collection of the Cleveland Museum of Art.

Description 
The Large Plane Trees is an oil painting on a 73.4 by 91.8 cm canvas. Van Gogh depicted road work in Saint-Rémy, and the autumn yellow leaves of plane trees.

This scene was repeated in The Road Menders, part of the Philips Collection in Washington D.C. In 2013, the two paintings were displayed together as part of the Van Gogh Repetitions exhibition at the Phillips Collection before The Large Plane Trees was moved to the Cleveland Museum of Art. Analysis shows that The Large Plane Trees was created first, with The Road Menders being a copy with virtually identical outlines.

References

Further reading 
 Marilyn Stokstad, David Cateforis, Stephen Addiss, Art History, Pearson/Prentice Hall, 2005.

External links 

 WikiArt entry
 Cleveland Museum of Art
 Useum

1889 paintings
Paintings by Vincent van Gogh
Paintings in the collection of the Cleveland Museum of Art